Minthodes is a genus of flies in the family Tachinidae.

Species
Minthodes atra (Kugler, 1971)
Minthodes brevipennis (Brauer & von Bergenstamm, 1889)
Minthodes diversipes (Strobl, 1899)
Minthodes latifacies Herting, 1983
Minthodes numidica Villeneuve, 1932
Minthodes picta (Zetterstedt, 1844)
Minthodes pictipennis Brauer & von Bergenstamm, 1889
Minthodes rhodesiana Villeneuve, 1942
Minthodes rossica (Mesnil, 1963)
Minthodes setifacies Mesnil, 1939
Minthodes simulans Herting, 1987
Minthodes susae Gilasian & Ziegler, 2016
Minthodes transiens Herting, 1987

References

Tachinidae
Taxa named by Friedrich Moritz Brauer
Taxa named by Julius von Bergenstamm
Diptera of Asia
Diptera of Africa
Diptera of Europe